The 2016 Nebraska Democratic presidential caucuses took place on March 5 in the U.S. state of Nebraska as one of the Democratic Party's primaries ahead of the 2016 presidential election.

On the same day, Democratic primaries were held in Kansas and in Louisiana, while the Republican Party held primaries in four states. The Republican Party and Libertarian Party Nebraska primaries were held on May 10.

Results

Analysis
Bernie Sanders beat Hillary Clinton by a wide margin in Nebraska (as Barack Obama had done in the state eight years earlier). The victory showcased his strength in Great Plains states and in the farm belt, as well as in states that held caucus contests. Sanders won victories in the two biggest cities: Omaha and Lincoln, winning a commanding victory in populous Douglas County. He also swept most of the rural, mostly white and deeply conservative counties of the state, including those in the Nebraska Panhandle and the Rainwater basin which are among the most radically conservative areas of the nation.

See also
 2016 Nebraska Republican presidential primary

References

Nebraska
Democratic caucuses
2016